The Kuttamuwa stele is an 800-pound basalt funerary stele with an Aramaic inscription referring to Kuttamuwa, an 8th-century BC royal official. It was found in Sam'al, in southeastern Turkey, in 2008, by the Neubauer Expedition of the Oriental Institute at the University of Chicago.

Description
The stele measures three feet tall and two feet wide. It was a stele for Kuttamuwa, an 8th-century BC royal official from Sam'al who ordered an inscribed stele, that was to be erected upon his death.

Inscription
The inscription requested that his mourners commemorate his life and his afterlife with feasts "for my soul that is in this stele." It is one of the earliest references in a Near East culture to a soul as a separate entity from the body.

The translation of the stele.
""I am KTMW (Kuttamuwa), servant of Panamuwa, who commissioned for myself (this) stele while still living. I placed it in an eternal chamber and established a feast (at) this chamber: a bull for Hadad Qarpatalli, a ram for NGD/R ṢWD/RN, a ram for Šamš, a ram for Hadad of the Vineyards, a ram for Kubaba, and a ram for my “soul” (NBŠ) that (will be) in this stele. Henceforth, whoever of my sons or of the sons of anybody (else) should come into possession of this chamber, let him take from the best (produce) of this vine(yard) (as) a (presentation)-offering year by year. He is also to perform the slaughter (prescribed above) in (proximity to) my “soul” and is to apportion for me a leg-cut.""

Text

Bibliography
 Schloen, J., & Fink, A. (2009). New Excavations at Zincirli Höyük in Turkey (Ancient Samʾal) and the Discovery of an Inscribed Mortuary Stele. Bulletin of the American Schools of Oriental Research, (356), 1-13. Retrieved September 16, 2020
 Pardee, Dennis (2009). "A New Aramaic Inscription from Zincirli." Bulletin of the American Schools of Oriental Research, (356), 51-71.

Notes

8th-century BC steles
2008 archaeological discoveries
Ancient Near East steles
Aramaic inscriptions